The Macau women's national basketball team is a national basketball team of Macau, organized and run by the Macau - China Basketball Association. (Chinese:中国澳门篮球总会)

See also 
 Macau women's national under-19 basketball team
 Macau women's national under-17 basketball team
 Macau women's national 3x3 team

References

External links
Macau-China Basketball Association 
Macau Basketball Records at FIBA Archive
Asia-Basket.com – Macau Women National Team

Macau
Basketball
Basketball teams in Macau
Basketball
Women's sport in Macau